A challenge coin is a small coin or medallion, bearing an organization's insignia or emblem and carried by the organization's members. Traditionally, they might be given to prove membership when asked and to enhance morale.  They are also collected by service members and law enforcement personnel. Historically, challenge coins were presented by unit commanders in recognition of special achievement by a member of the unit.  They could also be exchanged in recognition of visits to an organization.

Modern day challenge coins may feature popular culture attributes or organizational values. Modern challenge coins are made in a variety of sizes and are often made using popular culture references, including superheroes and other well-known characters in a way that creates a parody.

Origins

There are several stories detailing the origins of the challenge coin. Many originate in popular culture based on current events.

The Roman Empire rewarded soldiers by presenting them with coins to recognize their achievements. In Rome, if soldiers excelled in battle one day, they would receive their typical day's wages along with a separate bonus coin each. According to some accounts, these bonus coins were specially minted, featuring the marks of the legions from which they came. As a result, some soldiers apparently kept their coins as mementos, instead of spending them.

Challenge coins were also known as "Portrait Medals" during the Renaissance and were often used to commemorate specific events involving royalty, nobility, or other types of well-to-do individuals.  The medals would be given as gifts or awards, and people also exchanged them with friends and associates.  The most common format was for one side to depict the patron while the other showed something that represented that individual's family, house, lineage, and/or seal.

The first instance of using a coin as a response to an actual challenge may come from the 17th century religious wars in France. Following King Louis XIV's 1685 revocation of the Edict of Nantes, French Protestants began to suffer persecution by the state for their illegal religion. Many Protestants fled France to find religious freedom elsewhere. Among those who chose to remain in France were some from a Protestant group known as Huguenots who were forced to conduct their religious services in secret. In order to avoid infiltration by state spies the Huguenots began to carry their méreau communion coin. When challenged while trying to gain entry to Protestant church services the Huguenot would produce his méreau coin as a token to show allegiance with the Protestant Church and be admitted entry.

According to one story, challenge coins originated during World War I. Before the entry of the United States into the war in 1917 American volunteers from all parts of the country filled the newly formed flying squadrons of the Army and Naval Air Service. Some were wealthy scions attending colleges such as Yale and Harvard who quit in mid-term to join the war.

In one squadron, a wealthy lieutenant ordered medallions struck in solid bronze and presented them to his unit. One young pilot placed the medallion in a small leather pouch that he wore about his neck. Shortly after acquiring the medallion, the pilot's aircraft was severely damaged by ground fire. He was forced to land behind enemy lines and was immediately captured by a German patrol. In order to discourage his escape, the Germans took all of his personal identification except for the small leather pouch around his neck. In the meantime, he was taken to a small French town near the front. Taking advantage of a bombardment that night, he escaped. However, he was without personal identification. He succeeded in avoiding German patrols by donning civilian attire and reached the front lines. With great difficulty, he crossed no-man's land. Eventually, he stumbled onto a French outpost. Saboteurs had plagued the French in the sector. They sometimes masqueraded as civilians and wore civilian clothes. Not recognizing the young pilot's American accent, the French thought him to be a saboteur and made ready to execute him. He had no identification to prove his allegiance, but he did have his leather pouch containing the medallion. He showed the medallion to his would-be executioners and one of his French captors recognized the squadron insignia on the medallion. They delayed his execution long enough for him to confirm his identity. Instead of shooting him they gave him a bottle of wine.

Back at his squadron, it became tradition to ensure that all members carried their medallion or coin at all times. This was accomplished through challenge in the following manner: a challenger would ask to see the medallion, if the challenged could not produce a medallion, they were required to buy a drink of choice for the member who challenged them. If the challenged member produced a medallion, then the challenging member was required to pay for the drink. This tradition continued throughout the war and for many years after the war while surviving members of the squadron were still alive.

According to another story, challenge coins date back to World War II and were first used by Office of Strategic Service personnel who were deployed in Nazi held France. Similarly, Jim Harrington proposed a Jolly sixpence club amongst the junior officers of the 107th Infantry.  The coins were simply a local coin used as a "bona fides" during a personal meeting to help verify a person's identity. There would be specific aspects such as type of coin, date of the coin, etc. that were examined by each party. This helped prevent infiltration into the meeting by a spy who would have to have advance knowledge of the meeting time and place as well as what coin was to be presented, amongst other signals, as bona fides.

Others argue the tradition started in Vietnam, when an Army infantry-run bar tried to keep non-infantrymen away by forcing “outsiders” to buy drinks for the whole bar if they couldn't prove they had been in combat. The “proof” started with enemy bullets, then got a little out of control with grenades, rockets and unexploded ordnance. So, a coin-sized item emblazoned with the unit's insignia became the accepted form of proof. This tradition, now known as a coin check, continues today, hence it being called a “challenge” coin.

While a number of legends place the advent of challenge coins in the post-Korean Conflict era (some as late as the Vietnam War), or even later, Colonel William "Buffalo Bill" Quinn had coins made for those who served in his 17th Infantry Regiment during 1950 to 1958. The 17th Infantry Regiment "Buffalo" coin is the oldest challenge coin known in existence. On one side of the coin is a picture of a buffalo with the date 1812, which signified the year the unit was formed. On the other side was the 17th Infantry patch with the dates 1950 – 1958 and the word Korea to signify the tour. The cross and fort icon represent the unit's heritage which started in Cuba during the civil war. This coin is recognized as one of the oldest and most valuable challenge coins in circulation. Very few remain available, and most are thought to be in private collections.

Colonel Verne Green, commander of the 10th Special Forces Group-A, embraced the idea.  He had a special coin struck with the unit's badge and motto in 1969.  Until the 1980s, his unit was the only unit with an active challenge coin tradition.

There is another story about an American soldier scheduled to rendezvous with Philippine guerrillas during WWII.  As the story goes, he carried a Philippine solid silver coin that was stamped on one side with the unit insignia. The coin was used to verify, to the guerrillas, that the soldier was their valid contact for the mission against the Japanese.

The challenge coin tradition has spread to other military units, in all branches of service, and even to non-military organizations as well as the United States Congress, which produces challenge coins for members of Congress to give to constituents. Today, challenge coins are given to members upon joining an organization, as an award to improve morale, and sold to commemorate special occasions or as fundraisers. In the Air Force, military training instructors award an airman's coin to new enlisted personnel upon completion of their United States Air Force Basic Military Training and to new officers upon completion of the Air Force Officer Training School.

U.S. presidents

Challenge coins issued by presidents date back to the late 1990s. Separately, the White House Communication Agency (WHCA) has issued challenge coins for foreign heads and military during Presidential visits. In May 2018, controversy arose when WHCA released a coin featuring President Donald Trump and North Korean head Kim Jong-un ahead of peace talks scheduled for June 2018 in Singapore.

President Bill Clinton displayed several racks of challenge coins, which had been given to him by U.S. service members, on the credenza behind his Oval Office desks. These coins are currently on display at the Clinton Library. The challenge coins appear in the background of his official portrait, now hanging in the White House.

President George W. Bush received a challenge coin from a Marine combat patrol unit during his short but unexpected visit to Al Asad Airbase in Anbar province, Iraq, 3 September 2007.

President Barack Obama, in addition to handing challenge coins to U.S. service members, would leave coins on the memorial graves of dead soldiers.

President Donald Trump's coin broke with tradition, omitting the presidential seal, the motto "E pluribus unum" and the thirteen arrows representing the thirteen original states. His campaign slogan "Make America Great Again" appears on both sides. It features a banner at the bottom, which also serves as a base allowing the coin to stand upright.

President Joe Biden's coin depicts his home state of Delaware and "261st" for the 261st Theater Tactical Signal Brigade of the Delaware Army National Guard, his late son Beau Biden's unit.

Challenging

The tradition of a challenge is the most common way to ensure that members are carrying their unit's coin. The rules of a challenge are not always formalized for a unit, and may vary between organizations. The challenge only applies to those members that have been given a coin formally by their unit. This may lead to some controversy when challenges are initiated between members of different organizations and is not recommended. The tradition of the coin challenge is meant to be a source of morale in a unit, and forcing the challenge can cause a reverse effect.  The act of challenging is called a "coin check" and is usually loudly announced.

The challenge, which can be made at any time, begins with the challenger drawing his/her coin, and slapping or placing the coin on the table or bar. In noisy environments, continuously rapping the challenge coin on a surface may initiate the challenge. (Accidentally dropping a challenge coin is considered to be a deliberate challenge to all present.) Everyone being challenged must immediately produce the coin for their organization and anyone failing to do so must buy a round of drinks for the challenger and everyone else who has their challenge coin. However, should everyone challenged be able to produce their coin, the challenger must buy a round of drinks for the group.

While most holders of challenge coins usually carry them in their pockets or in some other readily accessible place on their persons, most versions of the rules permit a challenged person "a step and a reach" or if an individual has an extra coin to pass it off to the person closest to them.  Coins on belt buckles or key chains are not acceptable for meeting a challenge.  However, a coin worn in a pouch around the neck is acceptable for meeting a coin challenge.

Variants of the rules include, but are not limited to, the following: If someone is able to steal a challenge coin, everyone in the group must buy a drink for that person. During a challenge, everyone in the group must buy a drink for the holder of the highest-ranking coin.

A coin's rank is determined by the rank of the giver of the challenge coin. For example, a coin presented by an Admiral would outrank a coin presented by a Vice Admiral, while both would outrank a coin presented by a Captain. Traditionally, the presentation of a coin is passed during a handshake. Some units provide strict time limits to respond to a challenge. Also, coins are ranked in level of difficulty in attaining them. An Infantryman coin would outrank a logistical coin. A Ranger coin would outrank an Infantryman coin.

Traditionally, rules of a challenge include a prohibition against defacing the coin, especially if it makes it easier to carry at all times. If the challenge coin is attached to a belt buckle or key ring or has had a hole drilled in it to attach to a lanyard, it no longer qualifies as a challenge coin.

Appearance
There are many finishes available—from a simple pewter to 24K gold.  While there are only a few base metals, the patina (finish) can range from gold, silver, or nickel to brass, copper, or bronze—plus the antiqued variations. Soft or hard enamel or a printed inset with an epoxy coating may add color (the epoxies are often more resilient and scratch resistant than the metal surfaces).

Cost
Challenge coins are moderately inexpensive to design and produce. There are two basic processes by which to manufacture: zinc-alloy castings or die struck bronze.

Zinc alloy castings offer the advantage of low cost. Zinc casting also allows more flexibility in design like cutouts found on spinner coins or bottle opener coins. While a die struck bronze or brass coin is more expensive, the result renders a far superior product (numismatic quality).

, coins manufactured in China and South Korea typically cost between US $2.50 to US $7.00 per coin, depending on production process and complexity of design, laser engraving, enamels, voids, etc. The dies must be sculpted by an artist and can range in cost from US$50 to US$300, depending on complexity.  The cost of domestic manufacture can be many times this amount.

In order to be competitive, most North American companies offering challenge coins rely on having the product manufactured offshore. Many challenge coins are fabricated in South Korea, as the connection to the US military bases there is strong, and costs are cheaper than those made in the US.

Uses

Besides using coins for challenging, they are also used as rewards or awards for outstanding service or performance of duty. As such, they are used as a tool to build morale. Military officials occasionally give them to non-military personnel for outstanding service or rewards, like the case of student athletes at Northeastern University.

In the context as they are used by the modern U.S. military, the tradition probably began among special forces units during the Vietnam War.  The tradition spread through the Airborne community, and by the early 1980s also into the 75th Ranger Regiment.  As officers were reassigned as their careers progressed, they carried with them the tradition of awarding a unit coin for acts that were worthy of recognition but yet lacked enough merit to submit the soldiers act for an official medal.

One widely known challenge coin in the United States Air Force  was the "Bull Dog" challenge coin that was exclusive to B-52 enlisted tail gunners.  Since the B-52 gunner position was phased out in 1991, this famous challenge coin has become rarer.

This coin was presented to gunners upon graduation from their Air Force technical training and their entry into the "Gunners Association". In the earlier days of bombers, a bean or a nugget was used. The coin represents the attributes of strength and courage as reflected in the Bulldog, the gunner's official mascot. The coin was also given to certain "honorary gunners", usually commanders and leaders who portrayed the spirit of the bulldog.

Some collectors buy them for their numismatic value.

Coins given as awards for accomplishments are normally given to the recipient during a handshake, passing from the right hand of the giver to the right hand of the awardee. It is also normal for the giver to offer a brief explanation of the reason for awarding the coin.

Outside the military

Challenge coins are also exchanged outside the military. NASCAR, the NFL, cadets of the Civil Air Patrol, Eagle Scouts,  Canine Companions, and World Series of Poker all have their own challenge coins. They are also becoming popular with police departments, fire departments and fraternal organizations. In 2007, the Utah Symphony and Opera gave challenge coins to all of its staff and musicians, making it the first symphony organization in America to do so. Franklin Public School in Ontario has a coin that is given to graduates, featuring its mascot 'Frankie'. Many non-profits, especially those with connections to the military, give challenge coins to donors to acknowledge their support of the organization.
The FBI's Crisis Response unit was the first unit in the FBI to issue coins to unit members in late 1980s. Memorial coins can be used to commemorate fallen officers.

Officially licensed challenge coins

Louis "Uncle Louie" Gregory has created coins that are officially licensed by Topps Trading Cards, Ghostbusters, and Cobra Kai.

New York City Police Department

Coins have been created by the Police Benevolent Association for NYPD precincts. One of these coins was used as a fundraiser dedicated to an officer in the 67 Pct. who was injured in the line of duty, has been criticized for containing racist imagery despite the officer being of Afro American West Indian descent.

Motorcycle Clubs

Another organization in which challenge coins have gained popularity is the "National Association of Buffalo Soldiers and Troopers Motorcycle Club" (NABSTMC), which has over 85 chapters totaling over 2,000 members. The coin must be earned by the members for a noteworthy accomplishment.

In 2009, the Harley Owners Group (HOG) created and made available its own challenge coin to Harley-Davidson motorcycle owners.

Science
In the International Genetically Engineered Machine competition (iGEM), participants that won the 'Grand Prize' are given a challenge coin from 2016 on.

Varian Medical Systems, a medical device manufacturer, awards challenge coins for notable accomplishments by its service personnel.  A significant number of Varian's employees have military backgrounds, where many of them learn the electronics and mechanical skills needed to support Varian equipment.

Media, Business, and Education

Numerous examples illustrate challenge coins handed out in the media industry:

In 2020, a challenge coin went viral when America's largest challenge coin retailer released a coin about an incident that occurred in Connecticut with Trooper Spina.

In 2020, the Secretary of the State of Virginia sent a cease and desist to Louis "Uncle Louie" Gregory regarding a challenge coin he created.

In his audio commentary for the DVD release of Iron Man 2, film director Jon Favreau notes that he had Iron Man 2 challenge coins made to distribute to United States Air Force personnel as a gesture of thanks for their cooperation while the production (and its predecessor, Iron Man) filmed on location at Edwards Air Force Base.

Bill Prady, executive producer of The Big Bang Theory, gave the Big Bang Theory "executive producer's challenge coin" to the crew of the last space shuttle.

On the "Rockets" episode of Lock N' Load with R. Lee Ermey, R. Lee (Gunny) Ermey presents a challenge coin to Second Lieutenant Carr as a reward for being the "top gun" in his class with the Javelin Portable Rocket Launching System.

Members of the American Radio Relay League who are volunteer examiners may carry the VEC (volunteer examiner coordinator) challenge coin. These members are responsible for administering Federal Communications Commission sanctioned examinations that allow successful applicants to qualify as amateur radio operators in the three different license categories of: technician, general, and amateur extra.

The crew of Breaking Bad were given challenge coins designed by show creator Vince Gilligan for each new season. Another challenge coin was also included in the Blu-ray set of the entire series of the show.

Video game companies like Treyarch gave these coins with certain packages for the release of Black Ops 2.

The crowdfunded movie Lazer Team gave challenge coins to its backers as an optional perk of funding the movie.

A challenge coin is presented in a handshake to Gerard Butler's character in the 2018 film Hunter Killer.

Mystery Science Theater 3000 had challenge coins available for purchase commemorating their 30th anniversary on their 2018 30th anniversary "Watch Out For Snakes" Live Tour.

Meanwhile, examples can also be found in the realms of business and education. Many businesses are using corporate coins to recognize staff achievements, improve employee morale and reduce turnover,

For example, the Builders Association of the Twin Cities (BATC) issued a challenge coin highlighting their core values: "recruit, retain, grow."

Also, St Mary's University issued a coin honoring the Public Safety Administration.

Canada

One of the first appearance of a challenge coin within the Canadian Forces (CF) was that of the Canadian Airborne Regiment. Although conceptualized in the early 1970s, it was not officially adopted until the regiment returned from Cyprus in 1974.

Recognized as an "Americanism", the widespread use of challenge coins is new to the Canadian Forces and was introduced by General Rick Hillier as the Canadian Army began to work more closely with the US military. While many regiments and military establishments purchase them as 'challenge coins', most branches and schools within the CF use them for presentation purposes.

The first RCAF coin belonged to 427 Squadron. Back in the Second World War, 427 and the film studios Metro-Goldwyn-Mayer (MGM) shared the lion as their respective symbol. During a ceremony held on 27 May 1943, a bronze statuette of a lion was presented to the squadron as were MGM's coins for the squadron members. These coins granted free access to the MGM's theaters in Britain and were popular with aircrew and ground crew alike. In 1982, the custom was reintroduced by Lieutenant-Colonel Hugh Cunnigham, then the squadron commanding officer; it has since expanded widely within the RCAF tactical aviation community.

Every new officer cadet at the Royal Military College of Canada in Kingston, Ontario, is issued a challenge coin upon completion of First-Year Orientation Period. The coin is engraved with the name of the college in French and English surrounding the college's coat of arms on the obverse. The cadet's college number and the Memorial Arch is on the reverse surrounded by the motto in both languages.

Members of the Corps of Royal Canadian Electrical and Mechanical Engineers (RCEME) Fund are issued challenge coins with the current RCEME badge and the member's branch fund membership number on the obverse side, and the original pre-unification RCEME badge and branch motto on the reverse side. Usually, these are issued to craftsmen at the Canadian Forces School of Electrical and Mechanical Engineering, in Borden, Ontario, where branch fund membership is first offered.

The coin from Commander Canadian Special Operations Forces Command is a dull colour, but distinct by its pierced sections.

Many of the CF training centres and staff colleges have a distinct coin—some available for the students to purchase, others available only by presentation by the establishment or the commandant for exemplary achievement while attending the facility. General (retired) Walter Natynczyk, when he was Chief of the Defence Staff, and the Canadian Forces Chief Warrant Officer often presented their personalized coins to deserving soldiers.

Police, corrections, security and fire departments have embraced the concept, and have found coins to be an excellent means of team building and creating a sense of brotherhood or belonging. Many feature a patron saint, badge or representative equipment.

Switzerland

The challenge coin tradition was introduced into the Swiss Armed Forces by American officers on training missions and other assignments for the Organization for Security and Co-operation in Europe, of which Switzerland is a member. Coins are not issued, but rather ordered and paid for by Swiss officers of various branches within the Army.

Australia and New Zealand

Coins have come into use by various Australian and New Zealand political leaders, senior officers and NCOs, under the influence of presentations from American personnel. Several hundred types of New Zealand challenge coins have been produced in recent decades.

United Kingdom
Exchange officers and British military visitors to US units and formations in recent decades have often been presented with challenge coins. The British Army has had challenge coins for recruiting purposes since the mid-2000s - for example the Special Air Service and Royal Engineer units have such challenge coins. British military medical units also discovered the tradition while working with American units in Iraq and Afghanistan. The Department of Military Anesthesia and Critical Care has been issuing a coin since 2006.

Tradition dictates that challenge coins are shown within social environments (see above) with the loser of the “coin check” purchasing drinks for those others involved.  Following a turbulent period of change within the British Military, commanders have tightened restrictions on the consumption of alcohol and any activity that encourages drinking, leaving the traditional challenge coin as a collection item.

See also

References

Further reading

External links

  Art of Devastation, Metallic Art of WWI
  Podcast: Coin Check - 99% Invisible - Featuring COINFORCE CEO, Jordan Haines

 
Military life
United States military traditions
Exonumia
Militaria